Diana Gamage (Born 18 Dec 1965) is a  Sri Lankan politician and a member of the Parliament of Sri Lanka from the National List as a member of the Samagi Jana Balawegaya but has recently switched her political affiliation to Sri Lanka Podujana Peramuna

References

Samagi Jana Balawegaya politicians
Living people
Members of the 16th Parliament of Sri Lanka
1965 births